The 1995–96 NBA season was the Toronto Raptors' first season in the National Basketball Association. The Raptors, along with the Vancouver Grizzlies, played their first games in 1995, and were the first NBA teams to play in Canada since the 1946–47 Toronto Huskies. Retired All-Star point guard and former  Detroit Pistons legend Isiah Thomas became the team's General Manager. The Raptors revealed a new primary logo of a dinosaur playing basketball, and got new pinstripe uniforms with the logo on the front of their jerseys, adding purple and red to their color scheme. 

In the 1995 NBA expansion draft, the Raptors selected veteran players like B.J. Armstrong, Oliver Miller, Willie Anderson, Tony Massenburg, Ed Pinckney, Žan Tabak, Acie Earl and John Salley. However, Armstrong refused to play for the Raptors, and was traded to the Golden State Warriors in exchange for second-year forward Carlos Rogers and Victor Alexander. The team also signed free agents, former All-Star guard Alvin Robertson, and three-point specialist Tracy Murray. The Raptors received the seventh overall pick in the 1995 NBA draft, and selected point guard Damon Stoudamire from the University of Arizona. The team also hired Brendan Malone as their first head coach.

In their NBA regular season debut on November 3, 1995, the Raptors defeated the New Jersey Nets at the SkyDome, 94–79, but went on a 7-game losing streak afterwards, and held a 13–34 record at the All-Star break. At midseason, the team traded Anderson and Alexander to the New York Knicks in exchange for Doug Christie, and then traded Massenburg and Pinckney to the Philadelphia 76ers in exchange for second-year forward Sharone Wright, while Salley was released to free agency and signed with the Chicago Bulls. The Raptors finished their inaugural season last place in the Central Division with a 21–61 record.

Stoudamire averaged 19.0 points, 9.3 assists and 1.4 steals per game, and was named Rookie of the Year, and was named to the NBA All-Rookie First Team. He also won the MVP award in the Rookie Game during the All-Star Weekend in San Antonio. In addition, Murray finished second on the team in scoring, averaging 16.2 points per game, led them with 151 three-point field goals, and finished tied in fifth place in Most Improved Player voting, while Miller provided the team with 12.9 points, 7.4 rebounds, 1.4 steals and 1.9 blocks per game, and Robertson contributed 9.3 points, 4.4 rebounds, 4.2 assists and 2.2 steals per game. Off the bench, Tabak provided with 7.7 points and 4.8 rebounds per game, while Rogers also contributed 7.7 points per game, and Earl contributed 7.5 points per game. 

Following the season, Malone was fired as head coach after only just one season, while Murray signed as a free agent with the Washington Bullets, Miller signed with the Dallas Mavericks, and Robertson retired after ten seasons in the NBA. The Raptors' new logo would remain in use until 2008, where they changed the background of the logo from purple to red, while the original logo with the dinosaur lasted until 2015. The new pinstripe uniforms lasted until 1999.

Offseason

Expansion draft
The team's roster was then filled as a result of an expansion draft in 1995. Following a coin flip, Toronto was given first choice and selected Chicago Bulls point guard and three-point specialist B. J. Armstrong. Armstrong refused to report for training, and Thomas promptly traded him to the Golden State Warriors for power forwards Carlos Rogers and Victor Alexander. Thomas then selected a wide range of players in the expansion draft.

NBA Draft

Subsequent to the expansion draft, Toronto was given the seventh pick, after the Vancouver Grizzlies, in the 1995 NBA draft. They selected Damon Stoudamire, a point guard out of University of Arizona, around whom Thomas chose to base the franchise. The selection of Stoudamire was met with boos from fans at the 1995 NBA Draft at the SkyDome in Toronto, many of whom wanted Ed O'Bannon of UCLA, an NCAA Final Four MVP.

Roster

Roster notes
 Point guard Keith Jennings missed the entire season due to a knee injury, and never played for the Raptors.
 Point guard B.J. Tyler missed the entire season due to nerve damage after accidentally falling asleep with an ice pack on his ankle, and never played for the Raptors.

The first game
The Raptors’ first ever regular season game was played on November 3, 1995, against the New Jersey Nets at the SkyDome  in front of 33,306 fans.  Alvin Robertson scored the first points in Raptors history, as he hit a three pointer to give Toronto an early 3-0 lead.  The Raptors were led by Robertson, who scored a team high 30 points, as well as Damon Stoudamire, who had a double double in his first career game, scoring 10 points and adding 10 assists, as the Raptors defeated the Nets 94-79.

Regular season

The team played its first season in the Central Division, and before the inaugural season began, sales of Raptors merchandise ranked seventh in the league, marking a successful return of basketball to Canada. As GM, Isiah Thomas quickly staffed the management positions with his own personnel, naming long-time Detroit Pistons assistant Brendan Malone as the Raptors' head coach.

The Raptors concluded their inaugural season with a 21–61 win–loss record, although they were one of the nine teams to defeat the 1995–96 Chicago Bulls, who set an NBA best 72–10 win–loss regular season record. With averages of 19.0 points and 9.3 assists per game, Stoudamire also won the 1995–96 Rookie of the Year Award.

Highs
 December 10, 1995, The Raptors play the Vancouver Grizzlies for the first time. The game is held at General Motors Place in Vancouver. The Raptors win the game by a score of 93-81.
 March 24, 1996 – The Raptors beat the eventual NBA Champion Chicago Bulls by a score of 109-108, one of only ten losses the Bulls would suffer that season.  Michael Jordan attempted to win the game on the final shot. Though the ball went in, it did not count because the ball left his hand after the final buzzer.
 March 31, 1996 – The legendary Magic Johnson played his only game against the Toronto Raptors in Toronto. The Los Angeles Lakers won the game by a score of 111-106.

Stoudamire's breakout year
Stoudamire had a noteworthy rookie season with the Toronto Raptors averaging 9.3 assists and 19 points. He earned the nickname "Mighty Mouse" due to the fact he stands only 5'10" (1.77 m), and that he had a Mighty Mouse tattoo on his right arm going into his rookie season. Damon currently holds the record of having the third-highest assist average ever by a rookie, and rookie record setter for 3-pointers with 133, breaking the 3-point record previously held by Dennis Scott. Stoudamire was ranked second in scoring among all rookies in his rookie season, and led all rookies in minutes played and assists. He received the Shick Rookie of the Month Award twice and unanimously made the Shick All Rookie First Team. That same year Stoudamire was also awarded the Rookie of the Year Award for the 1995–1996 season, receiving 76 of the 113 possible votes and the Most Valuable Player of the All-Star Rookie Game. Stoudamire holds the record for being the second-lowest draft pick (seventh overall) to ever win the Rookie of the Year Award, the lowest being Mark Jackson (eighteenth overall). Damon is also known as the shortest player at 5'10" to ever win this award. He did not play the last 10 games of his rookie season due to an injury, Tendinitis in his left knee. The Raptors went 2–8 without him and finished 21–61 in his and the Raptors' rookie season.

Lows
 November 15, 1995 – The Raptors lose to the Houston Rockets by a score of 96 – 93. The loss culminates in a seven-game losing streak for the Raptors, the longest losing streak of the season.
 February 29, 1996 – The seven-game losing streak was duplicated. In a loss to the San Antonio Spurs, the final score was 120 – 95.
 March 29, 1996 – The Raptors suffer their worst loss of the season. The score was 126-86 in favour of the Orlando Magic. Prior to the game, Isiah Thomas and Brendan Malone got into an argument regarding playing time for rookies.

Season standings

Record vs. opponents

Game log

|- bgcolor="bbffbb"
| 1
| November 3
| New Jersey
| 
| Alvin Robertson (30)
| Alvin Robertson (7)
| Damon Stoudamire (10)
| SkyDome33,306
| 1-0
|- bgcolor="ffcccc"
| 2
| November 4
| @ Indiana
| 
| Damon Stoudamire (26)
| John Salley (9)
| Damon Stoudamire (11)
| Market Square Arena16,640
| 1-1
|- bgcolor="ffcccc"
| 3
| November 7
| @ Chicago
| 
| Willie Anderson (23)
| Oliver Miller (9)
| Damon Stoudamire (10)
| United Center23,102
| 1-2
|- bgcolor="ffcccc"
| 4
| November 8
| Sacramento
| 
| Tracy Murray (22)
| Oliver Miller (11)
| Willie Anderson (4)
| SkyDome16,793
| 1-3
|- bgcolor="ffcccc"
| 5
| November 10
| Phoenix
| 
| Tracy Murray (23)
| John Salley (11)
| Damon Stoudamire (7)
| SkyDome25,207
| 1-4
|- bgcolor="ffcccc"
| 6
| November 11
| @ Charlotte
| 
| Willie Anderson (24)
| Willie Anderson (9)
| Alvin Robertson (7)
| Charlotte Coliseum24,042
| 1-5
|- bgcolor="ffcccc"
| 7
| November 13
| Utah
| 
| Willie Anderson, Alvin Robertson (22)
| Ed Pinckney (10)
| Damon Stoudamire (9)
| SkyDome18,351
| 1-6
|- bgcolor="ffcccc"
| 8
| November 15
| Houston
| 
| Damon Stoudamire, Žan Tabak (20)
| Žan Tabak (15)
| Alvin Robertson (10)
| SkyDome20,831
| 1-7
|- bgcolor="bbffbb"
| 9
| November 17
| Minnesota
| 
| Damon Stoudamire (20)
| Oliver Miller, Damon Stoudamire (7)
| Damon Stoudamire (13)
| SkyDome18,401
| 2-7
|- bgcolor="bbffbb"
| 10
| November 18
| @ Washington
| 
| Damon Stoudamire (23)
| Willie Anderson (9)
| Damon Stoudamire (10)
| USAir Arena18,756
| 3-7
|- bgcolor="bbffbb"
| 11
| November 21
| Seattle
| 
| Oliver Miller (23)
| Damon Stoudamire (12)
| Damon Stoudamire (11)
| SkyDome21,836
| 4-7
|- bgcolor="ffcccc"
| 12
| November 22
| @ Milwaukee
| 
| Alvin Robertson (18)
| Ed Pinckney (8)
| Damon Stoudamire (9)
| Bradley Center14,959
| 4-8
|- bgcolor="ffcccc"
| 13
| November 25
| @ Atlanta
| 
| Tracy Murray (22)
| Ed Pinckney (13)
| Damon Stoudamire (9)
| Omni Coliseum10,253
| 4-9
|- bgcolor="bbffbb"
| 14
| November 27
| Golden State
| 
| Willie Anderson (26)
| John Salley (9)
| Damon Stoudamire (10)
| SkyDome19,563
| 5-9
|- bgcolor="ffcccc"
| 15
| November 28
| @ Cleveland
| 
| Damon Stoudamire (18)
| Žan Tabak (8)
| Willie Anderson (5)
| Gund Arena15,188
| 5-10

|- bgcolor="bbffbb"
| 16
| December 1
| Philadelphia
| 
| Willie Anderson (23)
| Ed Pinckney (16)
| Damon Stoudamire (10)
| SkyDome19,789
| 6-10
|- bgcolor="ffcccc"
| 17
| December 3
| Miami
| 
| Oliver Miller (29)
| Ed Pinckney (12)
| Damon Stoudamire (15)
| SkyDome21,238
| 6-11
|- bgcolor="ffcccc"
| 18
| December 5
| @ Seattle
| 
| Tracy Murray (23)
| Oliver Miller, Alvin Robertson, Žan Tabak (5)
| Alvin Robertson, Damon Stoudamire (5)
| KeyArena17,072
| 6-12
|- bgcolor="ffcccc"
| 19
| December 7
| @ Portland
| 
| Tracy Murray (28)
| Ed Pinckney (15)
| Damon Stoudamire (10)
| Rose Garden20,039
| 6-13
|- bgcolor="ffcccc"
| 20
| December 8
| @ L.A. Lakers
| 
| Damon Stoudamire (20)
| Ed Pinckney (8)
| Damon Stoudamire (10)
| Great Western Forum12,982
| 6-14
|- bgcolor="bbffbb"
| 21
| December 10
| @ Vancouver
| 
| Damon Stoudamire (24)
| Ed Pinckney (16)
| Damon Stoudamire (8)
| General Motors Place17,438
| 7-14
|- bgcolor="ffcccc"
| 22
| December 12
| Boston
| 
| Damon Stoudamire (18)
| Ed Pinckney (8)
| Damon Stoudamire (9)
| SkyDome21,875
| 7-15
|- bgcolor="ffcccc"
| 23
| December 14
| Indiana
| 
| Oliver Miller (22)
| Oliver Miller (12)
| Damon Stoudamire (13)
| SkyDome19,763
| 7-16
|- bgcolor="ffcccc"
| 24
| December 15
| @ Boston
| 
| Žan Tabak (18)
| Žan Tabak (8)
| Alvin Robertson, Damon Stoudamire (7)
| FleetCenter17,580
| 7-17
|- bgcolor="bbffbb"
| 25
| December 17
| Orlando
| 
| Damon Stoudamire (21)
| Ed Pinckney (11)
| Damon Stoudamire (10)
| SkyDome25,820
| 8-17
|- bgcolor="ffcccc"
| 26
| December 19
| Detroit
| 
| Damon Stoudamire (19)
| Oliver Miller (11)
| Damon Stoudamire (8)
| SkyDome21,128
| 8-18
|- bgcolor="ffcccc"
| 27
| December 22
| @ Chicago
| 
| Žan Tabak (24)
| Damon Stoudamire, Žan Tabak (8)
| Damon Stoudamire (13)
| United Center22,987
| 8-19
|- bgcolor="ffcccc"
| 28
| December 23
| @ New York
| 
| Damon Stoudamire (25)
| Ed Pinckney (10)
| Damon Stoudamire (8)
| Madison Square Garden19,763
| 8-20
|- bgcolor="bbffbb"
| 29
| December 26
| Milwaukee
| 
| Damon Stoudamire (21)
| Ed Pinckney (9)
| Damon Stoudamire (11)
| Copps Coliseum17,242
| 9-20
|- bgcolor="ffcccc"
| 30
| December 28
| @ Detroit
| 
| Damon Stoudamire (27)
| Oliver Miller (7)
| Damon Stoudamire (7)
| The Palace of Auburn Hills21,454
| 9-21

|- bgcolor="ffcccc"
| 31
| January 3
| @ Orlando
| 
| Alvin Robertson (27)
| Oliver Miller (12)
| Damon Stoudamire (13)
| Orlando Arena17,248
| 9-22
|- bgcolor="ffcccc"
| 32
| January 4
| @ Atlanta
| 
| Alvin Robertson (21)
| Willie Anderson, Ed Pinckney (7)
| Damon Stoudamire (10)
| Omni Coliseum7,194
| 9-23
|- bgcolor="ffcccc"
| 33
| January 9
| Charlotte
| 
| Tracy Murray (25)
| Tony Massenburg (8)
| Alvin Robertson, Damon Stoudamire (8)
| SkyDome20,326
| 9-24
|- bgcolor="ffcccc"
| 34
| January 11
| Atlanta
| 
| Damon Stoudamire (18)
| Tony Massenburg, Carlos Rogers, Žan Tabak (7)
| Damon Stoudamire (9)
| SkyDome19,868
| 9-25
|- bgcolor="bbffbb"
| 35
| January 13
| Washington
| 
| Damon Stoudamire (29)
| Tony Massenburg (11)
| Damon Stoudamire (11)
| SkyDome25,432
| 10-25
|- bgcolor="ffcccc"
| 36
| January 15
| @ New Jersey
| 
| Damon Stoudamire (18)
| Oliver Miller (9)
| Damon Stoudamire (11)
| Continental Airlines Arena10,034
| 10-26
|- bgcolor="ffcccc"
| 37
| January 16
| Indiana
| 
| Damon Stoudamire (29)
| Tony Massenburg (14)
| Damon Stoudamire (10)
| SkyDome19,868
| 10-27
|- bgcolor="ffcccc"
| 38
| January 18
| Chicago
| 
| Damon Stoudamire (26)
| Tony Massenburg (8)
| Damon Stoudamire (12)
| SkyDome36,118
| 10-28
|- bgcolor="bbffbb"
| 39
| January 21
| Boston
| 
| Damon Stoudamire (23)
| Tony Massenburg (14)
| Damon Stoudamire (9)
| SkyDome24,334
| 11-28
|- bgcolor="bbffbb"
| 40
| January 23
| New Jersey
| 
| Tracy Murray (16)
| Tony Massenburg (8)
| Damon Stoudamire (11)
| SkyDome20,915
| 12-28
|- bgcolor="ffcccc"
| 41
| January 25
| Vancouver
| 
| Damon Stoudamire (22)
| Oliver Miller (13)
| Damon Stoudamire (12)
| SkyDome21,378
| 12-29
|- bgcolor="ffcccc"
| 42
| January 27
| @ Denver
| 
| Damon Stoudamire (23)
| Tony Massenburg (11)
| Damon Stoudamire (5)
| McNichols Sports Arena16,635
| 12-30
|- bgcolor="ffcccc"
| 43
| January 30
| @ Sacramento
| 
| Oliver Miller (18)
| Tony Massenburg (5)
| Damon Stoudamire (6)
| ARCO Arena17,317
| 12-31

|- bgcolor="ffcccc"
| 44
| February 2
| @ Golden State
| 
| Damon Stoudamire (25)
| Oliver Miller (7)
| Damon Stoudamire (11)
| Oakland Coliseum15,025
| 12-32
|- bgcolor="bbffbb"
| 45
| February 3
| @ L.A. Clippers
| 
| Damon Stoudamire (25)
| Oliver Miller (11)
| Damon Stoudamire (6)
| Los Angeles Memorial Sports Arena5,846
| 13-32
|- bgcolor="ffcccc"
| 46
| February 5
| Portland
| 
| Tracy Murray, Damon Stoudamire (16)
| Tony Massenburg (10)
| Damon Stoudamire (7)
| SkyDome20,832
| 13-33
|- bgcolor="ffcccc"
| 47
| February 7
| Milwaukee
| 
| Oliver Miller (21)
| Oliver Miller (12)
| Damon Stoudamire (6)
| SkyDome21,335
| 13-34
|- bgcolor="bbffbb"
| 48
| February 13
| @ Miami
| 
| Damon Stoudamire (29)
| Alvin Robertson (12)
| Damon Stoudamire (7)
| Miami Arena14,286
| 14-34
|- bgcolor="ffcccc"
| 49
| February 15
| Cleveland
| 
| Willie Anderson (17)
| Oliver Miller (8)
| Damon Stoudamire (7)
| Copps Coliseum17,242
| 14-35
|- bgcolor="ffcccc"
| 50
| February 17
| @ Detroit
| 
| Oliver Miller (25)
| Tracy Murray (7)
| Damon Stoudamire (9)
| The Palace of Auburn Hills21,454
| 14-36
|- bgcolor="ffcccc"
| 51
| February 22
| @ Utah
| 
| Damon Stoudamire (23)
| Herb Williams (8)
| Damon Stoudamire (6)
| Delta Center19,911
| 14-37
|- bgcolor="ffcccc"
| 52
| February 23
| @ Phoenix
| 
| Damon Stoudamire (29)
| Oliver Miller (8)
| Damon Stoudamire (10)
| America West Arena19,023
| 14-38
|- bgcolor="ffcccc"
| 53
| February 25
| @ Dallas
| 
| Damon Stoudamire (23)
| Žan Tabak (16)
| Damon Stoudamire (10)
| Reunion Arena16,618
| 14-39
|- bgcolor="ffcccc"
| 54
| February 27
| @ Houston
| 
| Tracy Murray (22)
| Žan Tabak (10)
| Damon Stoudamire (19)
| The Summit16,200
| 14-40
|- bgcolor="ffcccc"
| 55
| February 29
| @ San Antonio
| 
| Oliver Miller, Oliver Miller (13)
| Oliver Miller (8)
| Damon Stoudamire (5)
| Alamodome18,083
| 14-41

|- bgcolor="bbffbb"
| 56
| March 3
| @ Cleveland
| 
| Tracy Murray (29)
| Doug Christie, Oliver Miller (5)
| Doug Christie (6)
| Gund Arena18,409
| 15-41
|- bgcolor="ffcccc"
| 57
| March 5
| Detroit
| 
| Sharone Wright (25)
| Oliver Miller (8)
| Damon Stoudamire (6)
| SkyDome22,968
| 15-42
|- bgcolor="ffcccc"
| 58
| March 6
| New York
| 
| Sharone Wright (18)
| Oliver Miller, Sharone Wright (8)
| Damon Stoudamire (15)
| SkyDome21,998
| 15-43
|- bgcolor="ffcccc"
| 59
| March 8
| @ Miami
| 
| Vincenzo Esposito (12)
| Oliver Miller (10)
| Damon Stoudamire (5)
| Miami Arena14,319
| 15-44
|- bgcolor="bbffbb"
| 60
| March 10
| Dallas
| 
| Damon Stoudamire (25)
| Žan Tabak (14)
| Damon Stoudamire (9)
| SkyDome21,873
| 16-44
|- bgcolor="ffcccc"
| 61
| March 12
| @ Philadelphia
| 
| Tracy Murray (31)
| Oliver Miller (11)
| Doug Christie, Alvin Robertson (8)
| CoreStates Spectrum8,806
| 16-45
|- bgcolor="ffcccc"
| 62
| March 15
| @ Charlotte
| 
| Oliver Miller, Damon Stoudamire, Sharone Wright (20)
| Oliver Miller (10)
| Damon Stoudamire (11)
| Charlotte Coliseum24,042
| 16-46
|- bgcolor="ffcccc"
| 63
| March 17
| @ Indiana
| 
| Damon Stoudamire (23)
| Tracy Murray (9)
| Damon Stoudamire (12)
| Market Square Arena16,579
| 16-47
|- bgcolor="ffcccc"
| 64
| March 18
| Denver
| 
| Tracy Murray (40)
| Oliver Miller (9)
| Damon Stoudamire (16)
| SkyDome20,324
| 16-48
|- bgcolor="bbffbb"
| 65
| March 20
| Charlotte
| 
| Carlos Rogers, Damon Stoudamire (24)
| Oliver Miller (15)
| Damon Stoudamire (10)
| SkyDome22,033
| 17-48
|- bgcolor="ffcccc"
| 66
| March 22
| San Antonio
| 
| Tracy Murray (29)
| Oliver Miller (12)
| Damon Stoudamire (13)
| SkyDome25,964
| 17-49
|- bgcolor="bbffbb"
| 67
| March 24
| Chicago
| 
| Damon Stoudamire (30)
| Oliver Miller, Tracy Murray (12)
| Damon Stoudamire (11)
| SkyDome36,131
| 18-49
|- bgcolor="ffcccc"
| 68
| March 26
| Atlanta
| 
| Tracy Murray, Damon Stoudamire (30)
| Oliver Miller, Tracy Murray (9)
| Damon Stoudamire (12)
| SkyDome21,473
| 18-50
|- bgcolor="ffcccc"
| 69
| March 27
| @ Philadelphia
| 
| Žan Tabak (26)
| Žan Tabak (11)
| Alvin Robertson (6)
| CoreStates Spectrum7,411
| 18-51
|- bgcolor="ffcccc"
| 70
| March 29
| Orlando
| 
| Damon Stoudamire (15)
| Carlos Rogers (9)
| Damon Stoudamire (5)
| SkyDome35,681
| 18-52
|- bgcolor="ffcccc"
| 71
| March 31
| L.A. Lakers
| 
| Tracy Murray (32)
| Tracy Murray (10)
| Damon Stoudamire (15)
| SkyDome36,046
| 18-53

|- bgcolor="bbffbb"
| 72
| April 2
| L.A. Clippers
| 
| Tracy Murray (30)
| Oliver Miller (15)
| Damon Stoudamire (12)
| SkyDome21,135
| 19-53
|- bgcolor="ffcccc"
| 73
| April 4
| Cleveland
| 
| Dwayne Whitfield (16)
| Dwayne Whitfield (12)
| Jimmy King (6)
| SkyDome21,173
| 19-54
|- bgcolor="ffcccc"
| 74
| April 6
| New York
| 
| Tracy Murray (23)
| Tracy Murray (8)
| Doug Christie, Oliver Miller (5)
| SkyDome23,168
| 19-55
|- bgcolor="ffcccc"
| 75
| April 8
| @ Minnesota
| 
| Doug Christie, Tracy Murray (21)
| Oliver Miller, Alvin Robertson (10)
| Alvin Robertson (7)
| Target Center13,011
| 19-56
|- bgcolor="bbffbb"
| 76
| April 9
| @ Milwaukee
| 
| Alvin Robertson (25)
| Alvin Robertson (10)
| Doug Christie, Alvin Robertson (6)
| Bradley Center15,935
| 20-56
|- bgcolor="ffcccc"
| 77
| April 12
| @ Boston
| 
| Acie Earl (40)
| Acie Earl (12)
| Jimmy King (6)
| FleetCenter17,930
| 20-57
|- bgcolor="ffcccc"
| 78
| April 14
| @ Washington
| 
| Acie Earl (26)
| Oliver Miller (17)
| Oliver Miller (5)
| USAir Arena18,756
| 20-58
|- bgcolor="ffcccc"
| 79
| April 15
| @ New York
| 
| Acie Earl (25)
| Acie Earl (11)
| Jimmy King (8)
| Madison Square Garden19,763
| 20-59
|- bgcolor="ffcccc"
| 80
| April 17
| @ New Jersey
| 
| Acie Earl (28)
| Alvin Robertson (13)
| Alvin Robertson (8)
| Continental Airlines Arena14,688
| 20-60
|- bgcolor="bbffbb"
| 81
| April 19
| Washington
| 
| Doug Christie (30)
| Oliver Miller (13)
| Oliver Miller (9)
| SkyDome24,454
| 21-60
|- bgcolor="ffcccc"
| 82
| April 21
| Philadelphia
| 
| Oliver Miller (35)
| Oliver Miller (12)
| Oliver Miller, Alvin Robertson (9)
| SkyDome27,118
| 21-61

Player statistics

Regular season

Franchise firsts
Point: Alvin Robertson

Award winners
 Damon Stoudamire, First Team, NBA All-Rookie Team
 Damon Stoudamire, NBA Rookie of the Year Award
 Damon Stoudamire, NBA Schick Rookie Game, MVP

Transactions

Trades

Free agents

Player Transactions Citation:

References

External links
 1995-96 Toronto Raptors season at Basketball Reference
 1995-96 Toronto Raptors season at Database Basketball
 Expansion Draft Details

Toronto Raptors seasons
Toronto
Tor